The Italian National Badminton Championships is a tournament organized to crown the best badminton players in Italy. The tournament started in 1977.

Since 1985 the championship also assigns the teams national title.

History
The Federazione italiana Badminton (FIBa), in english language Italian Badminton Federation was founded on 23 March 1985, for the transformation of the Associazione itlaina badminton (Italian Badminton Association), which arose in 1976 and became the National Sports Federation - FSN recognized by Italian National Olympic Committee (CONI) in 2000.

It is affiliated to the Badminton World Federation (BWF) and Badminton Europe (BE) of which it recognizes, accepts and applies the regulations and from which it is recognized as the only representative of Badminton in Italy.

Past winners

Champions teams

References

External links
FIBa Official website
Badminton Europe - Details of affiliated national organisations
FIBa - Federazione Italiana Badminton Yearbook

 

National badminton championships
Recurring sporting events established in 1977
Badminton tournaments in Italy
Badminton